Marcel Cupák (born 19 December 1973) is a Czech footballer who played as a forward. He played 199 matches in the Czech First League between 1993 and 2003. He also spent time at the second level of Czech football with České Budějovice in the spring of 1999. During his time at Drnovice, he played in the UEFA Cup in matches against 1860 Munich. Following his professional career, he played non-league football for TJ Sokol Křoví.

References

External links
 

1973 births
Living people
Czech footballers
Czech Republic under-21 international footballers
Czech First League players
FC Fastav Zlín players
FC Zbrojovka Brno players
SK Sigma Olomouc players
SK Dynamo České Budějovice players
FK Drnovice players
Association football forwards